Lynn Messina is an American author.

Biography
Messina grew up on Long Island and later moved to St. Louis, where she graduated with a library degree from Washington University. Messina has written five novels, with her best known novel being Fashionistas.

Messina has worked for many magazines and publications such as TV Guide and Rolling Stone. Messina had been working for InStyle Magazine during the writing of Fashionistas and was reportedly fired once her bosses discovered she was writing the novel.

Books
 The Girls' Guide to Dating Zombies (2012)
 Little Vampire Women (2010)
 Savvy Girl (2008)
 Mim Warner's Lost Her Cool (2005)
 Never on a Sundae (2004)
 Tallulahland (2004)
 Fashionistas (2003)

References

External links
Official Site

Year of birth missing (living people)
Living people
Washington University in St. Louis alumni
People from Long Island
21st-century American novelists
American women novelists
21st-century American women writers